Nature Reserves of Ukraine are protected areas of Ukraine, nature conservation and science researching institutions of state importance that are part of the Nature-Preservation Fund of Ukraine.

List

See also
 Categories of protected areas of Ukraine
 National Parks of Ukraine

References

External links

Nature Preserves
Protected areas of Ukraine
 
Ukraine
Nature Preserves